Convoy is a video game released on  for Microsoft Windows and Mac, and as Convoy: A Tactical Roguelike on April 8, 2020 for PlayStation 4 under a revised format. The game features pixel art graphics and roguelike squad based tactical combat.  In Convoy, the player must scour the wastelands of a desert planet in a defensively outfitted semi-trailer truck for parts to a crashed spaceship. The plot is experienced through interactive text based dialogue, where the player picks responses to written scenarios. The outcome of these scenarios sometimes turns in to tactical combat.

The game was part-funded through a Kickstarter campaign, raising €22,408 towards its development costs in November 2014.

Reception 
The game received a score of 72/100 on reviews aggregation website Metacritic, indicating mixed reviews.  A 3.6 out of 5 stars on the good old games store. And a "Mostly Positive" Rating on the Steam Store.

Alec Meer, in his review at Rock, Paper, Shotgun described it as an "FTL on wheels", but found the game too unforgiving and with fewer options for the player to recover from disadvantaged positions. But did indicate that he was playing a pre release build of the game. And said "in fact it's already improved and tightened up across the couple of weeks I’ve been sporadically playing it for"

References

External links
Official website

2015 video games
Indie video games
Action video games
MacOS games
PlayStation 4 games
Strategy video games
Kickstarter-funded video games
Video games developed in the Netherlands
Windows games
Single-player video games